Qiaoxi District is one of eight districts of the prefecture-level city of Shijiazhuang, the capital of Hebei Province, North China, located in the southwest of the urban core of the city.

Administrative divisions
List of subdistricts:
Dongli Subdistrict, Zhongshan Road Subdistrict, Nanchang Subdistrict, Weiming Subdistrict, Yuxi Subdistrict, Youyi Subdistrict, Hongqi Subdistrict, Xinshi Subdistrict, Yuandong Subdistrict, Xili Subdistrict, Zhentou Subdistrict

The only township is Liuying Township

External links

County-level divisions of Hebei
Shijiazhuang